The IMA Journal of Management Mathematics is a publication of Oxford University Press on behalf of the Institute of Mathematics and its Applications.

Abstracting and Indexing 
The IMA Journal of Numerical Analysis is abstracted and indexed in MathSciNet, American Mathematical Society, CSA, Current Contents, Journal Citation Reports, ProQuest, Science Citation Index, Ulrich's Periodicals Directory, and Zentralblatt Math. According to the latest Journal Citation Reports, the journal has a 2019 impact factor of 1.529, ranking it 51st out of 83 in the "Operations Research & Management Science" category, 58th out of 106 in the "Mathematics, Interdisciplinary Applications" category, 178th out of 226 in the "Management" category, and 24th out of 51 in the "Social Sciences, Mathematical Methods" category.

References

External links 
 Journal homepage
 Submission website
 Institute of Mathematics and its Applications

Mathematics journals
Hybrid open access journals
Oxford University Press academic journals
Publications established in 1986
Quarterly journals